The following is a list of radio stations in Croatia.

National coverage

HRT 
 Hrvatski radio - 1. program
 Hrvatski radio - 2. program
 Hrvatski radio - 3. program

Private radio stations 
 Hrvatski katolički radio
 bravo!
 Otvoreni radio

Regional coverage

Regional HRT radio stations 

 Radio Dubrovnik
 Radio Knin
 Radio Osijek
 Radio Pula
 Radio Rijeka
 Radio Sljeme
 Radio Split
 Radio Zadar

Private radio stations 

 Radio Kaj - Central and Northern Croatia (area of Kajkavian dialect)
 Radio Dalmacija - Dalmatia

Local coverage in FM

Former Radio's 

Totalni FM Zagreb
Totalni FM Split
Totalni FM Rijeka
Totalni FM Osijek
Totalni FM Sisak
Totalni FM Varaždin
Radio Velika Gorica
Jadranski Radio
Obiteljski Radio
Nautic Radio Kaštel
RTL Radio
Soundset Trsat
Soundset Brod
Radio Marin
Laganini FM Pula
Laganini FM Varaždin
Gradski Radio Osijek
Radio Riva
Radio Varaždin
Soundset Kult
Soundset Požega
Hrvatski Radio Karlovac
Radio BBR
Otoćni Radio Kornati
Radio Cibona - Sportski Radio
Hit FM
Prvi Radio
Soundset Plavi Radio
Hrvatski Radio Županja
Županjiski Radio Gospić
Radio Karlovac
Radio Čakovec
Radio GoGo Goričan
Radio SVID
Radio Zona Buzet
Županjiski Radio Šibenik
Radiopostaja Vinkovci
Soundset Giardini
Radio Zabok
Radio Beli Manastir
Radio 101 narodni radio''

DAB+ and Internet Radio 
Today more radio channels sent out on OIV Croatia DAB+  and the Internet.

 RADIO KAJ
 radio
 mojRADIO
 Yammat FM
 ANTENA
 	CMC Radio
 Narodni
 DALMATIA
 
 
 
 Trogir
 HRT - Glas Hrvatske

Sjeverni FM

References

External links
 Radio publishers  (in Croatian)
 List of radio programme content providers, AEM (in Croatian)

 
 
Croatia
Radio stations